SpVgg EGC Wirges is a German association football club from the city of Wirges, Rhineland-Palatinate.



History
Spielvereinigung Eintracht Glas-Chemie Wirges was formed 1 July 1972 through the merger of Sport Club Wirges (1924), Sportverein Rot-Weiß Keramchemie Siershahn (1921), and Sportverein Ebernhahn (1949). Through the late 1970s and early 1980s the club played third division football in the Amateurliga Rheinland and Amateur Oberliga Südwest where they earned unremarkable results. SpVgg EGC made appearances in the opening round of the DFB-Pokal (German Cup) competition in 1978 and 1979. Through the balance of the 1980s and into the 1990s the team played lower division football, highlighted by their third DFB-Pokal appearance in 1991. The club advanced to the Oberliga Südwest in 1994 for a two-year stint, and returned to the league once more in 1998, where they remained for many years as a mid-table side. During this time, the team also made another appearance in the DFB-Pokal in 2003.

The club's fifteen seasons in the Oberliga came to an end in 2013 when it was relegated back to the Rheinlandliga for a season. Winning the title in this league, the club quickly returned to the Oberliga Rheinland-Pfalz/Saar in 2014. At the end of the 2015–16 season SpVgg EGC Wirges decided to withdraw from the Oberliga to the Rheinlandliga despite finishing in tenth place, well above the relegation ranks.

Honours
The club's honours:

League
 Rheinlandliga (V-VI) 
 Champions: 1983, 1987, 1998, 2014

Cup
 Rhineland Cup 
 Winners: 1991, 2003
 Runners-up: 1978, 2000

Recent seasons
The recent season-by-season performance of the club:

With the introduction of the Regionalligas in 1994 and the 3. Liga in 2008 as the new third tier, below the 2. Bundesliga, all leagues below dropped one tier. In 2012 the Oberliga Südwest was renamed Oberliga Rheinland-Pfalz/Saar.

References

External links 
 Official team site
 SpVgg EGC Wirges at Weltfussball.de
 Das deutsche Fußball-Archiv historical German domestic league tables 

Football clubs in Germany
Football clubs in Rhineland-Palatinate
Association football clubs established in 1972
1972 establishments in Germany